Brian M Brazier (born 1942), is a male former boxer who competed for England.

Boxing career
He represented England and won a bronze medal in the 63.5 kg light welterweight at the 1962 British Empire and Commonwealth Games in Perth, Western Australia.

He was a member of the Croydon Boxing Club. He made his professional debut on 27 August 1963 and fought in 14 fights until 1966.

He was a member of the Army Boxing Club and was twice Light Welterweight ABA champion in 1961 and 1962.

References

1942 births
English male boxers
Commonwealth Games medallists in boxing
Commonwealth Games bronze medallists for England
Boxers at the 1962 British Empire and Commonwealth Games
Living people
Light-welterweight boxers
Medallists at the 1962 British Empire and Commonwealth Games